Aegopinella pura is a species of small land snail, a terrestrial pulmonate gastropod mollusk in the family Gastrodontidae, the glass snails.

Description
For terms see gastropod shell

The shell is colourless or weakly brown and weakly shiny. The microsculpture (only visible under a microscope, 35-40 x) is faint, spiral lines crossing irregular radial lines. There are 3.5-4 convex whorls, the last whorl increasing and not descending near aperture. The umbilicus is wide and slightly excentric.

Distribution 
This species occurs in countries and islands including:
 Czech Republic
 Ukraine
 Great Britain
 Ireland
 and other areas

Habitat
Aegopinella pura lives in deciduous forests where it can be found in the litter layer, underneath deadwood and at the base of vegetation. It preferes dry to humid habitats, especially on calcareous substrate.

Life cycle
In spring, the adult snails lay the eggs and die after that. Two years after hatching the juveniles reach their maturity.

References

 Kerney, M.P., Cameron, R.A.D. & Jungbluth, J-H. (1983). Die Landschnecken Nord- und Mitteleuropas. Ein Bestimmungsbuch für Biologen und Naturfreunde, 384 pp., 24 plates. [Summer or later]. Hamburg / Berlin (Paul Parey).
 Sysoev, A. V. & Schileyko, A. A. (2009). Land snails and slugs of Russia and adjacent countries. Sofia/Moskva (Pensoft). 312 pp., 142 plates. [June] [= Pensoft Series Faunistica No 87].

External links
Aegopinella pura at Animalbase taxonomy,short description, distribution, biology,status (threats), images

Gastrodontidae
Gastropods described in 1830